Idah Nabayiga (born 14 November 1979) is a Ugandan politician and the District Woman Representative for Kalangala District in Uganda's 10th Parliament. She is also a member of the National Resistance Movement on whose ticket she ran on in the 2016 general elections.

Background  
Idah Nabayiga was born in Kalangala District

Education 
Idah Nabayiga attended Memere Primary School . In 1994, she joined St. Henry's Buyege Secondary School for both her O and A levels . She later joined Makerere University in 2003 for a Bachelor of Arts degree. Idah Nabayiga also holds a Certificate in Administrative law obtained from Uganda's Law Development Centre in 2008. in 2011, she obtained a Postgraduate diploma in Human Resource Management from the Uganda Management Institute. Currently, she is pursuing a Master of Public Administration and Management still at Uganda Management Institute.

Career 
Before joining representative politics, Idah Nabayiga worked as a Community development Officer under Kalangala District Local Government between 2006 and 2012. Later on, between 2012–2015, she served as a Human Resource Officer still under the same administration.

Idah Nabayiga trained as a teacher and in Uganda's 10th Parliament, she serves on the Education and Sports Committee.

Controversy and activism 
Idah Nabayiga was cited as one of the National Resistance Movement MPs who defied President Yoweri Kaguta Museveni on the Mobile money Tax in 2018

A newspaper poll in 2017, listed Idah Nabayiga as one of the Members' of Parliament who had voted against the lifting of the Presidential Age Limit Bill. She reportedly declined the vote because of a possible fear of lynching by her electorate.

She has also been on record as having rejected the Uganda Government's denial of the Uganda People's Defence Force brutality against fishing communities on Lake Victoria.

Personal life 
Idah Nabayiga is married.

In 2016, she survived a motor accident when a car in which she was travelling overturned

References 

Members of the Parliament of Uganda
1979 births
Living people
Women members of the Parliament of Uganda